Plenitudo potestatis (Fullness of Power) was a term employed by medieval canonists to describe the jurisdictional power of the papacy.  In the thirteenth century, the canonists used the term plenitudo potestatis to characterize the power of the pope within the church, or, more rarely, the pope's prerogative in the secular sphere.  However, during the thirteenth century the pope's plenitudo potestatis expanded as the Church became increasingly centralized, and the pope's presence made itself felt every day in legislation, judicial appeals, and finance.

Although Plenitudo potestatis had been used in canonical writings since the time of Pope Leo I (440-461), Pope Innocent III (1198–1216) was the first pope to use the term regularly as a description of papal governmental power.  Many historians have concluded that the pope's jurisdiction within the church was unchallenged.  Essentially, the pope was the highest judge in the Church.  His decisions were absolute and could not be abrogated by inferior members of the ecclesiastical hierarchy.

Bibliography (chronological order) 
  Hof, Hans, "Plenitudo potestatis und imitatio imperii zur Zeit Innocenz III", Zeitschrift für katholische Theologie, 77, 1954–1955, p. 39-71.
 Watt, John A., "The Use of the Term plenitudo potestatis by Hostiensis", dans Proceedings of the Second International Congress of Medieval Canon Law (1963), éd. S. Kuttner, J. J. Ryan, Cité du Vatican, BAV, 1965, p. 161-187.
 Benson, Robert L. "Plenitudo potestatis : Evolution of a Formula from Gregory VII to Gratian", dans Collectanea Stephan Kuttner. Studia Gratiana 14, 1967, p. 195-217.
 McCready, William D., "Papal Plenitudo Potestatis and the Source of Temporal Authority in Late Medieval Papal Hierocratic Theory", Speculum 48, 1973, p. 654-674.
  Marchetto, Agostino, "In partem sollicitudinis… non in plenitudinem potestatis : evoluzione di una formula di rapporto primato-episcopato", dans Studia in honorem eminentissimi cardinalis Alphonsi M. Stickler, éd. R. J. Castillo Lara, Rome, Libreria Ateneo Salesiano, 1992, p. 269-298.
  Kéry, Lotte, "De plenitudo potestatis sed non de jure. Eine inquisitio von 1209/1210 gegen Abt Walter von Corbie (X, 5, 1, 22)", dans Licet preter solitum. Ludwig Falkenstein zum 65. Geburtstag, éd. L. Kéry, D. Lohrmann, H. Müller, Aix-la-Chapelle, Shaker Verlag, 1998, p. 91-117.
 Recchia, Alessandro, "L'uso della formula plenitudo potestatis da Leone Magno ad Uguccione da Pisa", Roma, Mursia, 1999.
 Schmidt, Hans-Joachim,  "The Papal and Imperial Concept of plenitudo potestatis : the Influence of Pope Innocent III on Emperor Frederick II"", dans Pope Innocent III and his World, éd. J. C. Moore, Aldershot, Ashgate, 1999, p. 305-314.
  Julien Théry, « Innocent III et les débuts de la théocratie pontificale», dans Mémoire dominicaine, 21 (2007), .
  Julien Théry, « Le triomphe de la théocratie pontificale, du IIIe concile du Latran au pontificat de Boniface VIII (1179–1303) », in Structures et dynamiques religieuses dans les sociétés de l’Occident latin (1179–1449), ed. by Marie-Madeleine de Cevins et Jean-Michel Matz, Rennes : Presses Universitaires de Rennes, 2010, online.
  Rizzi, Marco "Plenitudo potestatis. Dalla teologia politica alla teoria dello stato assoluto", dans Images, cultes, liturgies. Les connotations politiques du message religieux, éd. P. Ventrone, L. Gaffuri, Rome, Paris, École Française de Rome, Publications de la Sorbonne, 2014, p. 49-60.
  Julien Théry-Astruc, « Introduction », in Innocent III et le Midi (Cahiers de Fanjeaux, 50), Toulouse, Privat, 2015, p. 11-35, online].

Notes

References 

History of the papacy
Canon law history
Catholic Church legal terminology
Holy See
Papal primacy
Catholic political philosophy